The Pechanga Resort Casino is a Native American casino on the Pechanga Indian Reservation adjacent to the city of Temecula, California.

History
On June 24, 2002, the $262 million Pechanga Resort & Casino opened its doors. The resort, which was designed to highlight the Pechanga Band of Luiseño Indians' culture, included an  casino, 1,200-seat showroom, 14-story (522-room) hotel and  convention center, 200-seat cabaret lounge, Eagle's Nest Lounge and seven restaurants.

In November 2004, a  expansion opened, adding additional gaming space, a high-limit gaming area, a food court area, a 54-table poker room and Kelsey's, a sports-themed restaurant.

In 2018, Pechanga completed a 27-month, $300 million expansion that doubled its hotel room capacity to 1,090, expanded its spa facility to 25,000 square feet, created a 40,000-square foot events center, and built a 4 ½-acre tropical pool complex that features a dedicated restaurant, swim-up bar, three pools, two waterslides, a fountain, and 27 cabanas.

Guests must be at least 21 to gamble on the property; the age limit was raised in 2003 from 18.

Casino

The Pechanga Resort Casino has one of the largest casino floors in the country totaling 200,000 square feet, larger than the MGM Grand in Las Vegas. It features more than 5,000 Vegas-style slot machines in a completely non-smoking casino, 152 table games, High Limit Gaming Area with High Limit Salon, and private gaming rooms.

Hotel
The Pechanga Hotel includes 1,090 guest rooms and suites, as well as a 4.5-acre pool complex called The Cove (approximately the size of 5 football fields), a luxury spa, and 6 retail stores.

Spa Pechanga
In December 2017, Spa Pechanga opened a standalone, luxury two-level spa totaling 25,000 square feet and featuring 17 treatment rooms.

Restaurants
Pechanga has 15 bars and restaurants on its property.

Sports

Journey at Pechanga

The golf course, Journey at Pechanga, opened in August 2008, and the clubhouse opened in November.

In November 2008, a  clubhouse was opened. Journey was rated as the 4th "Best New Course You Can Play" by Golf Magazine in the January 2009 issue.

Live action sporting events
Pechanga Resort & Casino hosts live action sporting events such as Bellator MMA, professional boxing aired live on networks such as HBO and FOX and Muay Thai Kickboxing.

Entertainment
The Pechanga Theater, a 1,200-seat venue, has hosted Broadway musicals and headline musical acts, including Journey, Lita Ford, Warrant, Dirty Heads, Live (band), Collective Soul, Blues Traveler, Skid Row, 311 (band), Backstreet Boys, Bob Dylan, Carrie Underwood, The Fab Four (tribute), magician David Copperfield, comedian Jerry Seinfeld, and many foreign artists such as Hong Jin-young. Pechanga also offers the Pechanga Events Center, a 40,000 square foot facility seating approximately 3,000 people for concerts and shows. 

Other entertainment venues at Pechanga include the Pechanga Comedy Club and Eagle’s Nest Lounge, located on the top floor of the original hotel tower. (These are currently not open.)

Meeting and convention space
Meeting space at the facility consists of 274,500 square feet of meeting and event space (100,000 square feet indoors and 174,500 square feet outdoors).

Pechanga RV Resort

The adjacent Pechanga RV Resort features 210 sites.

Economic impact
Pechanga Resort & Casino is the Temecula Valley's largest employer with nearly 4,500 employees, and one of the largest private employers in Riverside County.

References

External links

https://www.nbclosangeles.com/news/local/food-truck-feeds-exhausted-healthcare-workers-during-pandemic-one-taco-at-a-time/2524353/
https://patch.com/california/murrieta/pechanga-gives-boost-murrieta-healthcare-workers-taco-vendor
https://www.ocregister.com/2020/09/25/best-of-orange-county-2020-best-southern-california-casino/

Luiseño
Casinos in Riverside County, California
Native American casinos
Boxing venues in California
Golf clubs and courses in California
Mixed martial arts venues in California
Temecula, California
Casinos completed in 2002
2002 establishments in California
Native American history of California